Flutterby is the debut album by Australian singer-songwriter Butterfly Boucher, first released in 2003.

Track listing
All songs written by Butterfly Boucher, except where noted.

Personnel
Butterfly Boucher – bass guitar, guitar, piano, violin, vocals
Ron Fair – conductor
John Goux – guitar
David Henry – cello
Lindsay Jamieson – drums
Abe Laboriel, Jr. – drums

Production
Producers: Butterfly Boucher, Robin Eaton, Ron Fair, Brad Jones
Executive producer: Mike Dixon
Engineers: Butterfly Boucher, Robin Eaton, Tal Herzberg, Brad Jones
Mixing: Jack Joseph Puig
Mastering: Brian Gardner, Ted Jensen
Digital editing: Tal Herzberg
Assistant: Anthony Kilhoffer
Arranger: Butterfly Boucher
Instrumentation: Butterfly Boucher
String arrangements: Ron Fair
Formatting: Liam Ward
Concept: Butterfly Boucher
Package design: Butterfly Boucher
Layout design: Butterfly Boucher, Liam Ward
Artwork: Butterfly Boucher
Photography: Thomas Petillo, Tina Tyrell
Cover photo: Thomas Petillo

Charts

References

Butterfly Boucher albums
2003 debut albums